The Taekwondo competition in the 2007 Summer Universiade were held in Bangkok, Thailand.

Medal overview

Men

Women

Medal table

External links
Summer Universiade Bangkok 2007

2007 Summer Universiade
Universiade
2007